The 1957–58 Ranji Trophy was the 24th season of the Ranji Trophy. Baroda won the title defeating Services in the final. Vidarbha made their debut in the competition.

Highlights
 The Zonal matches were played in a round-robin format, for the first time in Ranji Trophy history. 
 Bombay conceded its last match in the West Zone match against Baroda when it became certain that Baroda would qualify from the West Zone. It would be twenty years, 124 matches and 18 Ranji titles before Bombay lost another match outright, against Gujarat in 1977–78.
 Prakash Bhandari hit 227 and took 4/34 and 5/47 for Delhi against Patiala

Group stage

South Zone

Central Zone

North Zone

West Zone

East Zone

Points System
 Win : 8 points
 Draw (with First Innings Lead) : 5 points
 Draw (without First Innings Lead) : 3 points
 Lost : 0 points
 Bonus : 1 point

Knockout stage

Final

References

External links
 Ranji Trophy, 1957-58 as ESPN Cricinfo archive
 

1958 in Indian cricket
Ranji Trophy seasons